Héctor Daniel "Tito" Villalba (born 26 July 1994) is a professional footballer who plays as a winger for Primera División team Club Libertad. Born in Argentina, he represents Paraguay internationally.

Club career
Villalba was born on 26 July 1994 and lived almost to maturity in the Villa 1–11–14. He arrived in San Lorenzo when he was 10, and was chosen after a test in which 500 boys were selected to start a path to professionalism. He confessed to being a fan of San Lorenzo, and went through all the lower levels at the club.

On 18 August 2012, he made his debut in the Primera Division Argentina, against Estudiantes de La Plata, when he entered in the 37th minute of the second half replacing Luis Aguiar, with Ricardo Caruso Lombardi as team manager.

On 22 July 2016, Villaba signed as a young Designated Player with Major League Soccer side Atlanta United. He joined Liga MX side Tijuana on loan on 28 July 2016, but struggled to make many appearances for the club due to injury.

On 31 January 2020, Villaba was transferred to Paraguayan Primera División side Club Libertad for an undisclosed fee.

International career
Despite being born in Argentina, Héctor is also eligible to represent Paraguay because his father was born there. On 5 September 2018 Villalba made the one-time switch to Paraguay in hopes of making the squad for the 2019 Copa América and the 2022 FIFA World Cup.

On 25 September 2018 Villalba was called up to Paraguay along with fellow club teammate Miguel Almirón for a national team camp despite not scheduling any friendlies. He made his competitive debut with Paraguay on 20 November as a substitute in the second half of the friendly match against South Africa.

Career statistics

Club

International

Personal life

He can speak Guarani, an indigenous language spoken in Paraguay.

In January 2018, Villalba earned a U.S. green card which qualifies him as a domestic player for MLS roster purposes.

Honours

Club
San Lorenzo
Argentine Primera División: 2013 Inicial
Copa Libertadores: 2014
Supercopa Argentina: 2015

Atlanta United
MLS Cup: 2018
Eastern Conference (playoffs): 2018
U.S. Open Cup: 2019
Campeones Cup: 2019

Individual
MLS Goal of the Year: 2017

References

External links
 
 
 
 
 
 
 

1994 births
Living people
Footballers from Buenos Aires
Argentine sportspeople of Paraguayan descent
Citizens of Paraguay through descent
Argentine footballers
Argentine expatriate footballers
Paraguayan footballers
Paraguayan expatriate footballers
Paraguay international footballers
Association football forwards
San Lorenzo de Almagro footballers
Atlanta United FC players
Club Tijuana footballers
Club Libertad footballers
Expatriate footballers in Mexico
Expatriate soccer players in the United States
Argentine Primera División players
Liga MX players
Major League Soccer players
Designated Players (MLS)